Ralph Warren may refer to:
 Ralph Warren (American football) (1871–1928), All-American football player
 Ralph Warren (Lord Mayor) (c. 1481–1553), twice Lord Mayor of London
 Ralph Warren (politician) (1882–1954), Canadian member of Ontario and federal governments